S.R.Janakiraman (born 12 July 1928) is a Carnatic vocalist and a musicologist. He is a recipient of several awards including the Sangita Kala Acharya (The Music Academy), Kalaimamani from the Tamil Nadu Government and the Sangeet Natak Academy Award of the Government of India and the Padma Shri.

Music Teachers
S R Janakiraman started learning music in 1938. His big breakthrough came in 1945 when he joined Kalakshetra and learned music under the guidance of Tiger Varadachari, Budalur Krishnamurthy Sastri, T. K. Ramasami Ayyangar and Kalpagam Swaminathan. He also learned from Musiri Subramanya Ayyar and T Brinda.

Shri Janakiraman was initiated into musicology by Profs. P. Sambamurthi and Balakrishna Ayya.

Publications 
 Sangita Sampradaya Pradarshini — English translation of Lakshana Sangraha and Pracina Paddhati, 2010
 Sangita Shastra Saramu — A musicology text in Telugu
 Raga Lakshanas — A publication of the Music Academy Madras
 Ragas of Saramrta — A publication of the Music Academy Madras
 Essentials of Musicology — A short concise text dealing with the key elements of musicology
 Lakshana Gitas — Editor — A publication of the Music Academy Madras
 Ragas at a glance — A publication of Carnatica

Papers 
 The significance of the divisions of Pallavi, Anupallavi and Caranam JMAM
 Desi Suladi of Annamacarya, JMAM
 Pratimadhyama and its evolution, JMAM

Audio Visual Presentations 
 Varnas through the ages
 72-Mela ragamalika of Mahavaidhyanatha Iyer
 Pearls of South Indian Ragas — A CD from Brhaddhvani

References 

 Ragas at a Glance, Biography of the author
 Essentials of Musicology, Biography of the author

External links 
 Profile
 

1928 births
Living people
Indian musicologists
Recipients of the Padma Shri in arts
Male Carnatic singers
Carnatic singers
Recipients of the Sangeet Natak Akademi Fellowship
Recipients of the Sangeet Natak Akademi Award